Terrill R. Gilleland Jr (born April 11, 1977) in Baltimore, Maryland was a member of the Maryland House of Delegates. He was also a member of the Anne Arundel County Board of Education.

Education
Gilleland attended North County High School in Glen Burnie, Maryland. He graduated from Loyola College in 1999 with a B.A. in political science. He continued his education by getting his M.B.A. in finance from the University of Baltimore in 2001.

Career
Gilleland unsuccessfully challenged Democratic incumbent Ed DeGrange for a State Senate Seat in 2002, taking 41% of the vote. In 2003, Gilleland was appointed to the Maryland House of Delegates by Republican Governor Robert Ehrlich in May 2003, taking the place of Republican James E. Rzepkowski, who accepted a position within Ehrlich's cabinet as Associate Deputy Secretary for the Department of Business and Economic Development.

Gilleland was defeated in his first election as the incumbent in the 2006 general election by Pamela Beidle. The other two delegates for District 32, Democrats Mary Ann Love and Theodore Sophocleus, both won reelection.

Currently Gilleland is an Account Manager with an educational assessment firm. He is also a former chairman of the Anne Arundel County Republican Central Committee and a former student member of the Anne Arundel County Board of Education.

Legislative notes
 voted for the Healthy Air Act in 2006 (SB154)
 voted for slots in 2005 (HB1361)

External links
Terry Gilleland for Delegate
Gilleland biography, from the Maryland Archives
Gilleland biography, from the AACPS website

References and notes

1977 births
Living people
Members of the Maryland House of Delegates
University of Baltimore alumni
Gilleland. Terry R.
Loyola University Maryland alumni
Politicians from Baltimore
21st-century American politicians
School board members in Maryland